René Doynel de Saint-Quentin (2 December 1883 Garcelles-Secqueville - 15 March 1961 Paris) was a French diplomat, and French ambassador to the United States from 1938 to 1940.

Early life

His parents were Jeanne Marie Adélaïde Liégeard, and Louis Eugène Jules Doynel Count de Saint-Quentin (14 October 1850 - 18 April 1928). His maternal grandfather was the poet Stephen Liégeard. His cousin was the aviator Georges Guynemer.

De Saint-Quentin graduated from École libre des sciences politiques, and joined the Foreign Ministry in 1907.

Career
During World War I, he was drafted and wounded twice, he receiving several decorations; he was French military attaché in the British army in Egypt. He was stationed at the General Secretariat of the Berlin Peace Conference, and to the Protectorate of Morocco, he became in 1926 deputy director of African-Levant.

De Saint-Quentin served as the ambassador to the United States from March 1938 to September 1940. In 1940, he made the statement: If any other country is attacked by Russia ... we will move against the Soviets at once.
He returned to Vichy, France and took his new post on 27 January 1941. Two years later he resigned from the Vichy government, first joining General Henri Giraud, he then joined Charles de Gaulle in Algiers.

From 1946 to 1961, he was president of the Valentin Haüy charity Association for the Blind.

Death
De Saint-Quentin died on 15 March 1961 in Paris, France.

References

External links
 

1883 births
1961 deaths
Ambassadors of France to the United States
French military personnel of World War I